Diceros praecox is an extinct species of rhinoceros that lived in Africa during the Pliocene, around 4 million years ago. It is considered the direct ancestor of the living black rhinoceros (Diceros bicornis).

Taxonomy
Diceros praecox has for many years been classified as Ceratotherium praecox, however the original material describing the species has been shown to be closer to the black rhinoceros in its skull morphology. Other material showing greater similarities with the white rhinoceros are considered to belong to a different species, Ceratotherium mauritanicum. D. praecox likely arose from Ceratotherium neumayri.

Description
The teeth of D. praecox are similar to those of Ceratotherium neumayri. However, the longer skull suggests increased browsing specialization. The break-off of Diceros from Ceratotherium probably indicates ecological divergence and character displacement between browsing versus grazing specializations.

References

Pliocene mammals of Africa
Pliocene rhinoceroses